Darko Ristić (born 22 August 1988), is a Serbian futsal player who plays for Serbian club Ekonomac and the Serbia national futsal team. He also represented Serbia national futsal team at UEFA Futsal Euro 2016 in Serbia.

Career statistics

International

International goals

Honours
Ekonomac
 Serbian Prva Futsal Liga (1): 2015–16

References

External links
 

1988 births
Living people
Serbian men's futsal players
Sportspeople from Smederevo